The 1948 Little League World Series was held from August 25 to August 28 in Williamsport, Pennsylvania. The Lock Haven All Stars of Lock Haven, Pennsylvania, defeated the St. Petersburg All Stars of St. Petersburg, Florida, in the championship game of the 2nd Little League World Series. The event was referred to as the National Little League Tournament, as "World Series" naming was not adopted until the following year.

Teams

Bracket

References

External links
 1948 Tournament Bracket via Wayback Machine
 1948 Line Scores via Wayback Machine

Little League World Series
Little League World Series
Little League World Series